The wandering salamander (Aneides vagrans) is a species of salamander in the family Plethodontidae. It has a disjunct distribution, with one population being found in northern California in the United States, and another in British Columbia, Canada. It is a matter of debate whether this distribution is the result of human introductions or whether it has natural origins, with the latter conclusion being supported by more evidence. Its natural habitat is temperate forests. It is threatened by habitat loss from logging.

Description
The wandering salamander is very similar in appearance to the clouded salamander (Aneides ferreus) and was at one time considered to be the same species. The head is broader in males than in females. Between the nostrils and the mouth it has a pair of naso-labial grooves which are involved in chemoreception and it has sixteen costal grooves on either side of the body. The legs are relatively long and the toes have expanded terminal pads with square cut ends. The tail is prehensile and is round in cross section and used when the salamander clambers around among the branches of trees. The back varies in colour from brown to light grey, mottled or marbled and speckled with bronze flecks. It sometimes has a greenish sheen. The juveniles have a bronze stripe down the spine.

Distribution and habitat
The clouded salamander was traditionally thought to have a range that extended from northern California through Oregon and north to Vancouver Island, but it is absent from the state of Washington. In 1998, Jackman examined the mitochondrial DNA and allozymes of populations from various parts of the range and determined that those from California and Vancouver Island were similar but were distinct from the populations found in Oregon. He named the species from the two extremities as Aneides vagrans, the wandering salamander, while retaining the name Aneides ferreus for the Oregon population. 

In California it inhabits a narrow coastal strip of forested land with redwood, Douglas fir, cedar and alder. It prefers clearings or forest edges and may be abundant in recently cleared areas with tree stumps, fallen trees and woody debris. In Vancouver Island it is more widely distributed.

The cause of the disjunct distribution of A. vagrans is disputed. Jackman postulated that A. vagrans was introduced to Vancouver Island during the nineteenth century as the result of the import of large sheets of tanoak bark from California for the tanning industry. In the next century the salamander spread to nearly all the small offshore islets round Vancouver Island, probably on rafts of logs. However, many of the first detections of this species on Vancouver Island were made well before logging roads for transporting tanoak wood would have been developed, making this hypothesis unlikely. It is thus most probable that the disjunct distribution of A. vagrans has a natural cause, most likely by A. vagrans populations from California rafting to Vancouver Island during the Holocene on logs carried by the Davidson Current. It is also possible that A. vagrans was formerly more widespread along the West Coast until its range was fragmented by glaciation, with populations surviving in refugia in both California and Vancouver Island and expanding their range following glaciation, although this would likely lead to genetic divergence, which contrasts with genetic analysis supporting a very close genetic similarity between California and Vancouver populations.

Biology
It feeds at night on small invertebrates such as ants, mites, adult beetles and their larvae, snails, springtails and woodlice. During the day it hides under fallen trees, under rocks, in crevices, under bark and in rotten wood.

It has no lungs or gills, and breathes through its skin. For this reason it must keep moist at all times. In California it may aestivate in summer and be active in winter while in Vancouver Island it may be active in summer and hibernate in winter.

Breeding takes place in spring and early summer. The female lays a clutch of six to nine eggs in some concealed location such as under bark. She guards them as they develop and they eventually hatch directly into miniature adult salamanders with no aquatic larval stage.

Wandering salamanders will jump from the tree canopy when disturbed. They slow their speed through the air by splaying their limbs and are also able to exert some directional control in gliding by adjusting the position of their limbs and tail. This enables them to land on the trunk of a tree — often the same tree that they jumped from — instead of falling all the way to the ground.

Status
The wandering salamander is listed as Least concern in the IUCN Red List of Threatened Species.

References

Aneides
Amphibians described in 1998
Taxonomy articles created by Polbot